Edgelands is a term for the transitional, liminal zone of space created between rural and urban areas as formed by urbanisation. These spaces often contain nature alongside cities, towns, roads and other unsightly but necessary buildings, such as power substations or depots, at the edge of cities.

History
The concept of edgelands was introduced by Marion Shoard in 2002, to cover the disorganised but often fertile hinterland between planned town and over-managed country. However, a century and a half earlier, Victor Hugo had already highlighted the existence of what he called "bastard countryside ... ugly but bizarre, made up of two different natures, which surrounds certain great cities"; while Richard Jeffries similarly explored the London edgeland in Nature near London (1883).

See also

References

Further reading
 Richard Mabey, The Unofficial Countryside (1973)
 Marion Shoard, Edgelands (2002)
 Paul Farley and Michael Roberts, Edgelands (2012)

External links 
 Towards a Taxonomy of Edgelands Literature

Literary criticism
Cultural geography
Geography
Environmental humanities